A Woman Called Fancy is a 1951 historical novel by the American writer Frank Yerby. It was included in fifth place on the Publishers Weekly list of bestselling novels of 1951.

Synopsis
Fancy grows up in the Appalachian Mountains of South Carolina in the late Nineteenth Century. When she is nineteen she runs away from home to escape an arranged marriage. She ends up in Augusta in Georgia where she enjoys a series of romances.

References

Bibliography
 Andrews, William L., Foster, Frances Smith and Harris, Trudier. The Concise Oxford Companion to African American Literature. Oxford University Press, 2001.
 Farr, Sidney Saylor. Appalachian Women: An Annotated Bibliography. University Press of Kentucky, 2021.
 Korda, Michael. Making the List: A Cultural History of the American Bestseller, 1900–1999 : as Seen Through the Annual Bestseller Lists of Publishers Weekly. Barnes & Noble Publishing, 2001.

1951 American novels
American historical novels
Novels by Frank Yerby
Novels set in South Carolina
Novels set in Georgia (U.S. state)
Dial Press books
Novels set in the 19th century